Newnham is a village in West Northamptonshire in England. The A45 road runs a mile northwest of the village.

The villages name means 'At the new homestead/village' or 'at the new hemmed-in land'.

The village nestles below a large hill in the valley of the River Nene. The village name is thought to derive from the nearby River Nene. The hill, called Newnham Hill, is topped by an ancient disused windmill, and has commanding views over the nearby town of Daventry. Also on the hill is a large aerial which is part of the air traffic control system of the British Isles.

The parish church

The parish church, called St Michael and all Angels, is a former chapel of a parent church at Badby. The benefice has always been Badby-cum-Newnham, with the vicarage of Badby. As the church is perched high on a bank, the churchyard descends steeply east and south. The chancel, the north aisle and the present nave were built in the early 14th century, on the site of a 12th-century chapel. The western tower was built in the late 14th or early 15th century abutting the west wall and standing on three open arches. The tower has contained six bells since 1660. They were rehung on a new iron frame by John Taylor & Co in 1940.

Other village amenities
On the green is the Romer Arms, a public house which was originally called the Bakers Arms. It was bought by a man named Romer Williams, who was a hunting man and a lawyer by profession. He renamed it the Romer Arms and it is his family coat of arms that is depicted on the sign. Translated, the Latin inscription on the coat of arms is, 'To do and to suffer is the better way for the Roman'.  This is also "Maria's Kitchen" a Portuguese restaurant.

The village had another public house called the New Inn which is now a private residence. This former pub, cafe and hand-pumped petrol station, was on School Hill. A former proprietor, a Mr Howard, displayed a notice that read
You can have tea at teatime
— you can have beer at beer time
— you can have petrol at any time.

Other prominent buildings
Newnham Hall was the home of the former Lord Lieutenant of Northamptonshire, Lieutenant Colonel John Walkelyne Chandos-Pole OBE, who died in 1993.

Another fine residence is The Grove. Located in the grounds of The Grove, which was owned by the Marriott Family, is the Nuttery which is the site of a hazel orchard. The Nuttery was planted by the Marriotts of Newnham House. Hazel nuts are still picked, sorted in the house and then sent to Covent Garden. Daffodils and snowdrops grow underneath the trees and are picked in the spring for market. The orchard is open to the public.

Prominent residents
Newnham was the home of Thomas Randolph, a lesser-known 17th century poet. He was born, 15 June 1605, in Newnham at the brown stone gabled house in Poets Way. He was a poet and dramatist as well as a writer of English and Latin verse. He was an author of six plays including The Jovial Philosopher (1630); The Jealous Lovers (1632); The Muses' Looking-Glass (1638), and Amyntas (1638). It was recorded that Randolph was one of Ben Jonson’s cleverest disciples. Pleasant anecdotes are recorded of their relationship and one of Randolph's best poems is his, Gratulatory. Thomas Randolph died in 1634 at the age of 29.

Nigel Lawson
The former Chancellor of the Exchequer of Margaret Thatcher, Nigel Lawson lived close to the village for some years. On 1 July 1992 he was created a life peer as Baron Lawson of Blaby, of Newnham in the County of Northamptonshire. Lawson is the father of journalist and food writer Nigella Lawson, Dominic Lawson, the former editor of The Sunday Telegraph and Tom Lawson, housemaster of Chernocke House at Winchester College.

Newnham Windmill
At the summit of Newnham Hill near the edge of Beggars Bank is the village's most complete and prominent reminder of the rural industries. It is believed that a windmill has stood at this location as far back as 1661, when it was first recorded in an inventory of the then miller, John Bignell. The current building dates back to the early 19th century and was three floors high. The building was in a state of disrepair until the 1980s when a group was formed to repair and reconstruct the damaged building. Keys can be obtained to view the windmill by appointment through Daventry Tourist Information Centre.

See also
Thomas Randolph, poet and dramatist.

References

External links

Newnham Windmill
Newnham Primary School

Villages in Northamptonshire
West Northamptonshire District
Civil parishes in Northamptonshire